Zgornje Grušovlje is a settlement in the Municipality of Žalec in east-central Slovenia. It lies in the lower Savinja Valley northwest of Šempeter v Savinjski Dolini. The area is part of the traditional region of Styria. The municipality is now included in the Savinja Statistical Region.

The hamlet of Dolge Njive in the settlement is the site of a Roman Villa rustica.

References

External links
Zgornje Grušovlje at Geopedia

Populated places in the Municipality of Žalec